Termination of Employment Convention, 1982 is an International Labour Organization Convention. Its purpose is to coordinate minimum levels of job security in the laws of ILO member states.

Contents
art 2, establishes the scope and says short fixed term, probationary or casual workers may be excluded
art 3, defines termination as at the initiative of the employer
art 4, says the employer must have a valid reason for termination based on "the capacity or conduct of the worker or based on the operational requirements of the undertaking, establishment or service"
art 5, prohibits membership of a union, being a representative, seeking to assert a working right, or any discrimination based reason as becoming a valid reason.
art 6, temporary absence or sickness is not a reason
art 7, requires a minimum procedure for any disciplinary based dismissal where a worker has a chance to defend himself or herself
arts 8-10, require a procedure where a worker can appeal against a termination to an impartial authority
art 11, requires a reasonable period of notice before termination
art 12, requires redundancy or severance pay for income protection
art 13, requires consultation of worker representatives before collective redundancies

Ratifications
As of 2022, 36 states have ratified the convention. One of these states—Brazil—has subsequently denounced the treaty.

See also
Labour law
Unfair dismissal
Work council
UK labour law

External links 
Text.
Ratifications.

International Labour Organization conventions
Termination of employment
Treaties concluded in 1982
Treaties entered into force in 1985
Treaties of Antigua and Barbuda
Treaties of Australia
Treaties of Bosnia and Herzegovina
Treaties of Cameroon
Treaties of the Central African Republic
Treaties of Zaire
Treaties of Cyprus
Treaties of the People's Democratic Republic of Ethiopia
Treaties of Finland
Treaties of France
Treaties of Gabon
Treaties of Latvia
Treaties of Lesotho
Treaties of Luxembourg
Treaties of North Macedonia
Treaties of Malawi
Treaties of Moldova
Treaties of Montenegro
Treaties of Morocco
Treaties of Namibia
Treaties of Niger
Treaties of Papua New Guinea
Treaties of Portugal
Treaties of Saint Lucia
Treaties of Serbia and Montenegro
Treaties of Slovakia
Treaties of Slovenia
Treaties of Spain
Treaties of Sweden
Treaties of Turkey
Treaties of Uganda
Treaties of Ukraine
Treaties of Venezuela
Treaties of the Yemen Arab Republic
Treaties of Zambia
1982 in labor relations